Maynard Bert Thiel (May 4, 1926 – July 31, 2020) was an American professional baseball pitcher, manager and scout. He appeared in only four Major League games as a relief pitcher for the 1952 Boston Braves, but fashioned a 14-year playing career in the minor leagues (1947–59; 1961).

Thiel's MLB trial occurred at the outset of the 1952 season. He split two decisions, allowed 11 hits, four bases on balls and six earned runs, and compiled an earned run average of 7.71 over seven innings pitched. He struck out six. He earned his victory in relief on April 19 at Shibe Park. Entering the game in the seventh inning with Boston trailing 7–6, Thiel hurled two scoreless innings, allowing only one hit and one walk to hold the opposition Philadelphia Phillies at bay until he exited in the top of the ninth for a pinch hitter, Jack Daniels, whose single ignited a three-runs Braves' rally. Boston forged ahead 9–7; Lew Burdette came on for the save, and Thiel had secured his first and only MLB win.

As a minor league hurler, however, Thiel won 145 games and lost 108 for a .563 winning percentage and compiled an earned run average of 3.76. He had one 20-win season, and enjoyed 18, 16, 15 and 14 game-winning seasons during a career spent in the farm systems of the Braves, New York and San Francisco Giants, and Boston Red Sox.

Thiel managed in the Kansas City Athletics and Chicago White Sox organizations, and scouted for the Washington Senators, Braves and ChiSox after his playing career. Thiel died at home on July 31, 2020, at the age of 94.

References

External links

1926 births
2020 deaths
Atlanta Braves scouts
Baseball players from Wisconsin
Boston Braves players
Chicago White Sox scouts
Corpus Christi Giants players
Dallas Eagles players
Eau Claire Bears players
Hartford Chiefs players
Jackson Senators players
Major League Baseball pitchers
Milwaukee Brewers (minor league) players
Minneapolis Millers (baseball) players
Minor league baseball managers
New Orleans Pelicans (baseball) players
People from Marion, Wisconsin
Pocatello Bannocks players
San Francisco Seals (baseball) players
Toledo Sox players
Washington Senators (1961–1971) scouts